Harish Chandra or Harish-Chandra may refer to:

Harish-Chandra Indian American mathematician and physicist (1923–1983)
Harish-Chandra Research Institute
Harish-Chandra's c-function
Harish-Chandra's regularity theorem
Harish-Chandra isomorphism
Harish C. Mehta Indian historian and academic
Harish Chandra Postgraduate College
Harish Chandra Burnwal
Harish Chandra Mukherjee
Harish Chandra Singh Rawat
Harish Chandra Durgapal
Harish Chandra Patel
Harish Chandra Mitra
Harish Chandra (raja)
Harish Chandra Sarin

See also
Harishchandra (disambiguation)